Clyde Wise Smith (July 17, 1904 – December 30, 1982) was an American football player and coach. He played professionally as a center for four seasons in the National Football League (NFL) with the Kansas City Cowboys (1925–1926), the Columbus Tigers (1927), and the Providence Steam Roller (1928). Smith served as the head football coach at the College of Emporia in Emporia, Kansas for four seasons, from 1931 to 1934, compiling a record of 10–19–4.

Smith later coached football at Bridgeport High School in Bridgeport, Illinois. He owned the Lawrenceville Greenhouses, was chaired the Lawrence Country Housing authority, and was a board member of the Lawrence County Chamber of Commerce. Smith died on December 30, 1982, at his home in Lawrenceville, Illinois.

Head coaching record

References

External links
 
 

1904 births
1982 deaths
American football centers
College of Emporia Fighting Presbies football coaches
Columbus Tigers players
Kansas City Cowboys (NFL) players
Missouri Tigers football players
Providence Steam Roller players
High school football coaches in Illinois
People from Crawford County, Missouri
People from Sapulpa, Oklahoma
Players of American football from Oklahoma